Moray Low (born 28 November 1984 in Torphins, Aberdeenshire, Scotland) is a retired rugby union player.
Low's position of choice is as a Prop. He is capable of playing on both sides of the scrum.

He was called up to the Scotland squad for the 2008 Six Nations Championship, where he made his debut coming on as a second substitute for Alasdair Dickinson against France in the Stade de France.

Low was named in the Scotland squad for the 2011 Rugby World Cup but played no part in any of Scotland's four games.

It was announced on 16 February 2014 that Low will be joining English Aviva Premiership side Exeter Chiefs on a two-year deal.  He would go on to spend five years with the Chiefs reaching three Premiership Finals in that time.

In May 2019, Low announced his retirement from Rugby.  It was revealed he planned to focus on a property development business he had set up with former team-mate and Exeter Chiefs defense coach Julian Salvi..

References

External links
Glasgow profile
 Scotland profile
itsrugby stats

1984 births
Living people
Aberdeen GSFP RFC players
Exeter Chiefs players
Glasgow Warriors players
People from Marr
Rugby union players from Aberdeenshire
Rugby union props
Scotland Club XV international rugby union players
Scotland international rugby union players
Scottish rugby union players